Derek Jones (born May 22, 1992) is a Canadian former professional football who was a defensive back in the Canadian Football League (CFL). He was drafted 29th overall in the fourth round of the 2014 CFL Draft by the Winnipeg Blue Bombers. On February 11, 2020, he signed a two-year contract with the BC Lions. He played college football for the Simon Fraser Clan, and retired from football on June 23, 2021.

His father, Ed Jones, played in the CFL for nine years and won five Grey Cup championships with the Edmonton Eskimos.

References

External links
BC Lions bio

1992 births
Living people
Canadian football defensive backs
Canadian football people from Edmonton
Players of Canadian football from Alberta
Simon Fraser Clan football players
Winnipeg Blue Bombers players
BC Lions players